Starveall and Stony Down is a 22.5 hectare biological Site of Special Scientific Interest in the parishes of Codford and Wylye, Wiltshire, England, notified in 1971.

Sources

 English Nature citation sheet for the site (accessed 14 August 2006)

External links
 English Nature website (SSSI information)

Sites of Special Scientific Interest in Wiltshire
Sites of Special Scientific Interest notified in 1971